Julio Cabrera Balsa (born 1 March 1942) is a Spanish former backstroke swimmer who competed in the 1960 Summer Olympics.

Notes

References

External links
 
 
 
 

1942 births
Living people
Spanish male backstroke swimmers
Olympic swimmers of Spain
Swimmers at the 1960 Summer Olympics
Mediterranean Games medalists in swimming
Mediterranean Games gold medalists for Spain
Mediterranean Games silver medalists for Spain
Swimmers at the 1963 Mediterranean Games
Swimmers at the 1967 Mediterranean Games
Universiade medalists in swimming
Universiade bronze medalists for Spain
Medalists at the 1963 Summer Universiade
20th-century Spanish people